Trillium stamineum, the twisted trillium, also known as the Blue Ridge wakerobin, is a species of flowering plant in the family Melanthiaceae. It is native to the southeastern United States, in Alabama, Mississippi and Tennessee. Its natural habitat is calcareous woodlands.

In 1901, Harbison compared T. stamineum to T. sessile. The former is distinguished by its pubescent stem, unusual petals, long erect stamens, and very short filaments.

Description

Trillium stamineum is a perennial herbaceous plant that spreads by means of underground rhizomes.

T. stamineum flowers between March and May, depending on latitude. A solitary flower is carried directly on the leaves. The carrion-scented flower of this species attracts scavenging flies and other insects for pollination.

All flower parts (stamens, filaments, anthers, ovary, stigmas) are purple or dark purple. Even the fruit is purple. In 1975, Freeman described a form that is devoid of purple pigment, which he called Trillium stamineum f. luteum. That name is now regarded as a synonym.

Bibliography

References

External links 

 

stamineum
Endemic flora of the United States
Flora of Alabama
Flora of Mississippi
Flora of Tennessee
Plants described in 1901